Carmen Ionescu (born 22 November 1985 in Bucharest, Romania) is a retired  Romanian artistic gymnast. She is a gold world medalist with the team (2001).

Carmen was among the first gymnasts to compete a three-and-a-half twisting back somersault on the floor exercise.

External links
 Bio and List of competitive results

1985 births
Living people
Gymnasts from Bucharest
Romanian female artistic gymnasts
Medalists at the World Artistic Gymnastics Championships
21st-century Romanian women